Sheikh Ijaz Nisar was the caretaker Chief Minister of Punjab, Pakistan from 19 November 2007 to 11 April 2008 and the Chief Justice of the Lahore High Court.

References

|-

|-

Living people
Chief Ministers of Punjab, Pakistan
Pakistani judges
Year of birth missing (living people)